İnanç Oktay Özdemir (born 1986) is a German actor with turkish roots.

Filmography

Television

References

External links

1986 births
German people of Turkish descent
German male film actors
German male television actors
Living people